Adult Contemporary is a chart published by Billboard ranking the top-performing songs in the United States in the adult contemporary music (AC) market. In 1988, 22 songs topped the chart, then published under the title Hot Adult Contemporary, based on playlists submitted by radio stations.

In the year's first issue of Billboard the number one song was "Got My Mind Set on You" by George Harrison, which was in its third week at number one.  It held the top spot for two weeks in 1988 before being displaced by "Everywhere" by British-American rock group Fleetwood Mac.  In March, actor Patrick Swayze reached number one with the song "She's Like the Wind", featuring Wendy Fraser, taken from the soundtrack of the film Dirty Dancing, in which he starred.  It was the second AC chart-topper from the film, following "(I've Had) The Time of My Life" by Bill Medley and Jennifer Warnes, which had reached number one the previous year.  British singer Phil Collins topped the chart with two songs from the soundtrack of the film Buster, in which he played the lead role, reaching the top spot with his rendition of the 1960s song "A Groovy Kind of Love" and the original track "Two Hearts".

Gloria Estefan and her band Miami Sound Machine were the only act to have three number ones during the year, but they were the final three hits on which Miami Sound Machine received separate billing; all Estefan's subsequent hits were credited to her alone.  The Latin-influenced group spent a total of five weeks at number one, tying with Whitney Houston and Phil Collins for the most time spent atop the chart by an act during 1988.  Collins and Houston each achieved their total with two number ones; British vocalists Rick Astley and George Michael were the only other acts with multiple chart toppers during the year. The year's longest unbroken run at number one was achieved by Peter Cetera, whose song "One Good Woman" spent four weeks in the top spot in the fall.  Chicago, the group which Cetera had fronted for nearly two decades before leaving in 1985, achieved its first number one since his departure when "Look Away" spent a single week in the top spot in December.  The final Hot Adult Contemporary number one of 1988 was "Two Hearts" by Phil Collins, which held the top spot for the last two weeks of the year.

Chart history

References

See also
1988 in music
List of artists who reached number one on the U.S. Adult Contemporary chart

1988
1988 record charts
1988 in American music